List of champions of the 1896 U.S. National Championships tennis tournament (now known as the US Open). The men's tournament was held from 17 August to 26 August on the outdoor grass courts at the Newport Casino in Newport, Rhode Island. The women's tournament was held from 17 June to 20 June on the outdoor grass courts at the Philadelphia Cricket Club in Philadelphia, Pennsylvania. It was the 17th U.S. National Championships and the second Grand Slam tournament of the year.

Finals

Men's singles

 Robert Wrenn defeated  Fred Hovey  7–5, 3–6, 6–0, 1–6, 6–1

Women's singles

 Elisabeth Moore defeated  Juliette Atkinson  6–4, 4–6, 6–2, 6–2

Men's doubles
 Carr Neel /  Sam Neel defeated  Robert Wrenn /  Malcolm Chace 6–3, 1–6, 6–1, 3–6, 6–1

Women's doubles
 Elisabeth Moore /  Juliette Atkinson defeated  Annabella Wistar /  Amy Williams 6–3, 9–7

Mixed doubles
 Juliette Atkinson /  Edwin P. Fischer defeated  Amy Williams /  Mantle Fielding 6–2, 6–3, 6–3

References

External links
Official US Open website

 
U.S. National Championships
U.S. National Championships (tennis) by year
U.S. National Championships
U.S. National Championships
U.S. National Championships
U.S. National Championships